Tommy Clark (born Nathan Bennet) is a character in Heroes Reborn. Tommy is portrayed by Robbie Kay. Tommy and Luke Collins are the only characters to appear in all thirteen episodes.

Character history
Tommy is first seen attending a support group for evos, seeking advice on how to control his abilities. Failing at getting assistance, he leaves, but later hears that everyone in the support group was murdered. The next day at school, Tommy is punched by Brad, a high school bully who catches him staring at his girlfriend, Emily. Emily takes pity on Tommy and offers him a job at Moe's Ice Cream Parlor. Tommy accepts, and the two quickly become friends. While there, Tommy notices Luke Collins sitting at a table and recognizes him as a survivor of the previous night. Tommy approaches Luke for information, and is immediately ambushed by Joanne, who coerces him at gunpoint to step outside. Sensing that something is wrong, Emily follows them and calls out for Tommy. Before Joanne can attack, Tommy teleports her gun away, then her and her husband, and runs away. Emily follows him in her car and promises to keep his secret.

Tommy and Emily sit in a gardening shed outside their school and discuss the workings of his ability. He is overseen by Brad teleporting away a flower in Emily's hand. When Emily leaves, Brad confronts Tommy and blackmails him for a favor, taking him to his house and asking him to make his abusive step father disappear. Initially compliant, Tommy soon flees. Caspar Abraham, a mysterious protector, intervenes, and uses his ability to manipulate the abusive adult's memory. When Brad returns, he finds his step father missing, and, assuming it to be Tommy's doing, befriends him in gratitude. 
Later that evening, Emily discovers the flower that Tommy made vanish inside a bucket of ice cream, and deduces that the objects Tommy teleports go to a destination he is thinking of.

When Anne, Tommy’s adoptive mother is injured in a car accident, Tommy offers his blood but isn’t a match and is then told that he has been reported due to being an evo.

Powers and abilities
At first, Tommy's ability appears to be a variant of teleportation. By touching an object, Tommy can make it disappear, but is initially unaware of what happens to it. He eventually learns that it is sent to whatever location he's thinking about and learns to control it. By touching his hand to his chest when using his ability, Tommy becomes able to teleport himself and others he's touching. At one point, he indicates his ability is strong enough to teleport the Eiffel Tower if he so wishes.

It is eventually revealed that Tommy's actual ability is a form of power absorption with similarities to Arthur Petrelli's power and Peter Petrelli's second power. In Tommy's case, he absorbs the power of an evo he touches, permanently stripping them of their ability, but loses access to that ability after taking the power of another evo. The only evo who does not permanently lose their ability when he takes it on is his twin sister Malina. Tommy has taken both regeneration from Claire Bennet and space-time manipulation from Hiro Nakamura.

After the discovery that his active ability is in fact Hiro's, his use of the power expands, and he gains the ability to stop time and time travel. He can also selectively unfreeze others as seen in "Company Woman" and can send others through time with a touch, similar to how he originally used the teleportation aspect of the ability. After being trapped in Evernow, Tommy learns how to be in two places at once, effectively splitting himself into two distinct selves that remain connected but act separately in different time periods, and retain all the abilities of the original Tommy. Tommy's version of Hiro's ability has a different visual effect, with anything he uses it on traveling through a vortex-like effect rather than simply disappearing into thin air in Hiro's variant. Tommy's version is also stated to be stronger, with Anne Clark telling Tommy in "Company Woman" of Hiro himself attesting to his greater potential.

By holding hands with his sister Malina, Tommy can take on her ability of elemental manipulation. Unlike with the other powers Tommy absorbs, this is not permanent and after he lets go of her hand, Tommy resumes his previous ability. However, without a conduit to channel their combined power through, Tommy and Malina are unable to safely use this power, and it will ultimately be fatal to them. With a willing conduit, together they can create a magnetic shield around the Earth powerful enough to deflect a massive solar flare, though this is inevitably fatal to the conduit.

Tommy's current absorbed ability is Hiro Nakamura's space-time manipulation as of "Project Reborn."

Reception
When describing the new characters for Heroes reborn Tommy was described as “gawky teen” 

Tommy has also been described as “an awkward evo teen with a mysterious past”.

References

External links
 Tommy Clark on IMDb

Television characters introduced in 2015
Fictional twins
Adoptee characters in television
Heroes (American TV series) characters